Houdek is a surname. Notable people with the surname include:

Dan Houdek (born 1989), Czech footballer
Dušan Houdek (born 1931), Czech sports shooter
Jacques Houdek (born 1981), Croatian singer
Tomáš Houdek (ice hockey) (born 1981), Czech ice hockey player

Czech-language surnames